Gerd Baltus (29 March 1932 – 13 December 2019) was a German television actor.

Baltus was born in Bremen. While doing law studies Baltus became interested in acting. In 1952 he got his first theatre booking in Hamburg, later in Bonn, West Berlin and Munich.

Baltus became known to a broad public however above all as a regular guest with crime film series such as Derrick and Tatort. He had basic roles also in the miniseries PS (1975) and in the popular family saga , where he starred with Ernst Schröder and Hans Korte before the camera. Besides his film work Baltus worked extensively as a speaker of radio plays.

In 1964 he received the Federal Film Award for his work in the film The Blood of the Walsungs. He died in Hamburg.

Filmography

References

External links 
 

1932 births
2019 deaths
Actors from Bremen
German male television actors
20th-century German male actors
21st-century German male actors